José Manuel Pérez de Vega (born 10 May 1947) is a Spanish bobsledder. He competed in the two-man and the four-man events at the 1968 Winter Olympics.

References

External links
 
 
 

1947 births
Living people
Spanish male bobsledders
Olympic bobsledders of Spain
Bobsledders at the 1968 Winter Olympics
Sportspeople from Valencia